The Frederick Miller House, near White Plains, Kentucky, was built c.1850.  It was listed on the National Register of Historic Places in 1988.

It is a frame two-story double cell house with a central chimney.  Its interior has a Greek Revival-style mantle.

References

Houses on the National Register of Historic Places in Kentucky
Houses completed in 1850
National Register of Historic Places in Hopkins County, Kentucky
1850 establishments in Kentucky
Houses in Hopkins County, Kentucky